Thelma Peake (née Mason, 30 April 1914 – 15 June 1982) was an Australian track and field athlete who won gold and bronze medals at the 1938 British Empire Games in Sydney.

Peake won three successive Long Jump National Championships during the 1930s, but also competed in sprints, hurdles and middle-distance events. At the 1938 Empire Games she was a member of the Australian relay team which won the gold medal in the 220-110-220-110 yards event. In the long jump competition she won the bronze medal and in the 80 metre hurdles contest she finished fifth. In the 100 yards event she was disqualified in the semi-finals.

See also
 Australian athletics champions (Women)

References

External links
 
 

1914 births
1982 deaths
Athletes (track and field) at the 1938 British Empire Games
Australian female hurdlers
Australian female long jumpers
Australian female middle-distance runners
Commonwealth Games gold medallists for Australia
Commonwealth Games medallists in athletics
20th-century Australian women
Medallists at the 1938 British Empire Games